The Ale Is Dear is a 1996 studio album by the Celtic band Clandestine.

Track listing
 "Atholl Highlanders/Jig of Slurs" - 3:53
 "Polka Set" - 3:31
 "Ottawa/Frahar's Jig/Donald McKissup" - 4:32
 "Drover's Lad/Mug of Brown Ale/The Cliffs of Moher/The Cock of the North" - 4:47
 "The Road to Linsdoonvarna/Gravel Walk/Silver Spear" - 2:56
 "Tornado Song" - 3:15
 "Loch Torridon/The Ale is Dear/The High Road to Linton" - 3:43
 "Cullen Bay/Lord Lovat's Lament/Scotland the Brave/Cabar Feidh" - 6:34
 "Saucy Sailor/Queen of the Rushes" - 4:14
 "Paddy's Set" - 6:10
 "Rocky Road to Dublin" - 2:47
 "Lucy Cassidy/The Struggle/The Wise Maid/The Mason's Apron" - 4:16

1996 albums
Clandestine (band) albums
Celtic folk albums